Sierra Blanca Regional Airport  is a public use airport located on the Fort Stanton mesa 15 nautical miles (28 km) northeast of the central business district of Ruidoso, a village in Lincoln County, New Mexico, United States. It is owned by the Village of Ruidoso. According to the FAA's National Plan of Integrated Airport Systems for 2009–2013, it is classified as a general aviation airport.

Facilities and aircraft 
It has two asphalt paved runways: 6/24 is 8,099 by 100 feet (2,469 x 30 m) and 12/30 is 6,500 by 75 feet (1,981 x 23 m).

For the 12-month period ending March 31, 2009, the airport had 7,002 aircraft operations, an average of 19 per day: 83.6% general aviation, 11.5% air taxi, 3.5% scheduled commercial, and 1.4% military. At that time there were 37 aircraft based at this airport: 86.5% single-engine, 8.1% multi-engine, 2.7% jet and 2.7% helicopter.

History 
The Sierra Blanca Regional Airport opened on December 11, 1987. It was built to replace the much smaller Ruidoso airport which was located within the city of Ruidoso and had seen many accidents due to its location in a mountain valley.

Ruidoso was served by several commuter airlines between 1976 and 2008 with flights to Albuquerque, El Paso, Midland/Odessa, and Dallas/Ft. Worth (DFW). These carriers used such commuter aircraft as the Piper Navajo, Cessna 208 Caravan, Beechcraft 1300, and the Swearingen Metroliner. Among these airlines were: Roswell Airlines (1976-1978), Airways of New Mexico (1978-1979), Wise Airlines (1984), Mesa Airlines (1987-1990), Air Ruidoso (1987-1989), Lone Star Airlines (1995-1997), Rio Grande Air (2001), and Pacific Wings, dba New Mexico Airlines (2008). Lone Star Airlines briefly operated a 32-seat Dornier 328 propjet in 1995 with a flight to DFW that stopped in Roswell. In 2005 American Eagle Airlines announced its intent to serve the airport with nonstop regional jets to DFW on behalf of American Airlines; however, this service did not materialize and the city of Ruidoso later joined into a consortium with other cities in southeastern New Mexico to have American Eagle serve Roswell, New Mexico via the Roswell International Air Center (ROW) airport located 70 miles to the east.

References

External links 
 Sierra Blanca Regional Airport home page
 Aerial photo as of 18 October 1996 from USGS The National Map
 

Airports in New Mexico
Transportation in Lincoln County, New Mexico
Buildings and structures in Lincoln County, New Mexico